Derek Raymond Bangham FRCP (19 September 1924 – 2 January 2008) was a British doctor and research scientist.

Early life 
He was born in Manchester, England on 19 September 1924 and attended The Downs School, near Malvern, where his teachers included W. H. Auden, and Bryanston School.
 
He was declared medically unfit to serve during World War II, and instead read biological sciences at King's College London, afterwards attending University College Hospital Medical School.

Career 

In 1952, he gave up medical practice to join the National Institute for Medical Research (NIMR), investigating parasites. He was promoted to Head of the Division of Biological Standards at the NIMR in 1961.

From 1972 to 1987 he was Head of the Hormones Division of the National Institute for Biological Standards and Control (NIBSC).

He was also a member of the World Health Organization's European committee on biological standardization, the committee of the European Pharmacopoeia and the committee of the British Pharmacopoeia Commission.

Personal life 

Bangham was an accomplished amateur artist. Two of his paintings are in the collection of the Royal Free Hospital.

He died on 2 January 2008. His brother was Alec Bangham.

Awards 

 Silver plate of the Society for Endocrinology (1986; the first awarded) for his "distinguished contribution to British endocrinology"
 Fellowship of the Royal College of Physicians (1981)

Notable works

References

External links 

 
 

1924 births
2008 deaths
British pharmacologists
People educated at The Downs School, Herefordshire
Alumni of King's College London
Alumni of University College London
20th-century British painters
British endocrinologists